Parliamentary elections were held in Crimea on 31 March 2002. The Communist Party of Ukraine emerged as the largest faction in the Supreme Council, with 15 of the 100 seats, although 46 seats were won by independents.

Background
Following the 1998 elections, a majoritarian system was introduced that did not ensure the proper representation of the minorities, especially that of the Crimean Tatars, in the Supreme Council.

Results

References

2002 elections in Ukraine
Elections in Crimea
March 2002 events in Ukraine